Miss Terra Brasil (in native language, or Miss Earth Brazil) is an annual national beauty pageant realized in Brazil to select its entrant in the Miss Earth pageant.

History

2001-2007: Beleza Brazil
Miss Terra Brasil is the official preliminary of the international Miss Earth beauty pageant in Brazil. It was founded in 2001 and was originally called Beleza Brasil organized by Beauty Productions Brazil Ltda. from 2001 to 2007.

The first titleholder of the pageant was Simone Régis, who was crowned Beleza Brasil 2001. She went to represent Brazil in the first edition of Miss Earth beauty pageant in the Philippines and she won the Miss Air crown (first runner up) on 28 October 2001.

In 2003, Priscila Poleselo Zandoná from the state of Paraná duplicated the feat of Régis when she won the Miss Air crown in the Miss Earth 2003.

2008-present: Miss Terra Brazil

The pageant changed its name in 2008 to Miss Terra Brasil organized by Look Top Beauty Productions. The organization is led by the current national director José Alonso Dias from Minas Gerais.

The Miss Terra Brasil is part of a major campaign which values the ecological advocacy of each region of the country. The pageant contributes to the promotion of environmental preservation, ecological diversity, and ecotourism in Brazil.

Every year, each state holds a preliminary competition to choose their delegate for the national competition, Miss Terra Brasil pageant. The winners have the task of representing their state with beauty and elegance and defend the ecological cause of the country, as the slogan of the competition. Although the highest scoring candidate will receive the title of Miss Terra Brasil
and will compete on behalf of the country in the Miss Earth international competition, the pageant also chooses three other winners: Miss Fire, Miss Water, and Miss Air and will represent Brazil in other international competitions.

In 2010, the pageant further intensified its ecological preservation campaign, and so each candidate represents an ecological niche or a tourist spot in her state which can have up to three to four representatives each state.

Starting 2011, the winner of Miss Terra Brasil 2012 and its three elemental court will receive brand new cars as prizes and all expenses paid for their stay at the Divinópolis City and will remain there throughout the period before the international contest in which they will participate, where all the preparations will be held, including beauty treatments, psychological training, postural training, English language and speech enhancement, physical fitness, runway skills, environmental education, and dietary guidelines among others. The candidates who will compete for the title of Miss Terra Brasil 2012 will represent cities or tourist spots of ecological tourism in Brazil. Each regional coordinator will be entitled to submit up to four representatives to the competition, representing cities and tourist points of ecological tourism of their respective states.

Titleholders
Color key

 Below, the winners of the national beauty pageant:

See also

 Miss Earth

References

External links
 Miss Earth Brazil

Beauty pageants in Brazil
Brazilian awards
Recurring events established in 2001
Brazil
2001 establishments in Brazil